Oliver P. Morton  is a 1900 marble statue of Governor Oliver P. Morton by Charles Henry Niehaus installed in the United States Capitol, in Washington, D.C., as part of the National Statuary Hall Collection. It is one of two statues donated by the state of Indiana. The statue was accepted into the collection on April 14, 1900, by Indiana Senator Albert J. Beveridge.,

The statue is one of eight that Niehaus has had placed in the Collection.

References

External links
 

1900 establishments in Washington, D.C.
1900 sculptures
Marble sculptures in Washington, D.C.
Monuments and memorials in Washington, D.C.
Morton, Oliver P.
Sculptures of men in Washington, D.C.
Governor of Indiana